Ivan Tukhtachev (born 13 July 1989, in Angarsk) is a Russian middle-distance runner. At the 2012 Summer Olympics, he competed in the Men's 800 metres.  In 2009, he won the 1500 m at the European under-23 championships.

References

1989 births
Living people
People from Angarsk
Sportspeople from Irkutsk Oblast
Russian male middle-distance runners
Olympic male middle-distance runners
Olympic athletes of Russia
Athletes (track and field) at the 2012 Summer Olympics
Russian Athletics Championships winners